An artificial neuron is a mathematical function conceived as a model of biological neurons, a neural network. Artificial neurons are elementary units in an artificial neural network. Usually each input is separately weighted, and the sum is passed through a non-linear function known as an activation function or transfer function. The transfer functions usually have a sigmoid shape, but they may also take the form of other non-linear functions, piecewise linear functions, or step functions. They are also often  monotonically increasing, continuous, differentiable and bounded. Non-monotonic, unbounded and oscillating activation functions with multiple zeros that outperform sigmoidal and ReLU like activation functions on many tasks have also been recently explored. The thresholding function has inspired building logic gates referred to as threshold logic; applicable to building logic circuits resembling brain processing. For example, new devices such as memristors have been extensively used to develop such logic in recent times.

The artificial neuron transfer function should not be confused with a linear system's transfer function.

Artificial neurons can also refer to artificial cells in neuromorphic engineering  that are similar to natural physical neurons.

Basic structure 
For a given artificial neuron k, let there be m + 1 inputs with signals x0 through xm and weights wk0 through wkm. Usually, the x0 input is assigned the value +1, which makes it a bias input with wk0 = bk. This leaves only m actual inputs to the neuron: from x1 to xm.

The output of the kth neuron is:

Where  (phi) is the  transfer function (commonly  a threshold function).

The output is analogous to the axon of a biological neuron, and its value propagates to the input of the next layer, through a synapse. It may also exit the system, possibly as part of an output vector.

It has no learning process as such. Its transfer function weights are calculated and threshold value are predetermined.

Types

Depending on the specific model used they may be called a semi-linear unit,  Nv neuron, binary neuron, linear threshold function, or McCulloch–Pitts (MCP) neuron.

Simple artificial neurons, such as the McCulloch–Pitts model, are sometimes described as "caricature models", since they are intended to reflect one or more neurophysiological observations, but without regard to realism.

Biological models

Artificial neurons are designed to mimic aspects of their biological counterparts. However a significant performance gap exists between biological and artificial neural networks. In particular single biological neurons in the human brain with oscillating activation function capable of learning the XOR function have been discovered. 
 Dendrites – In a biological neuron, the dendrites act as the input vector. These dendrites allow the cell to receive signals from a large (>1000) number of neighboring neurons. As in the above mathematical treatment, each dendrite is able to perform "multiplication" by that dendrite's "weight value." The multiplication is accomplished by increasing or decreasing the ratio of synaptic neurotransmitters to signal chemicals introduced into the dendrite in response to the synaptic neurotransmitter. A negative multiplication effect can be achieved by transmitting signal inhibitors (i.e. oppositely charged ions) along the dendrite in response to the reception of synaptic neurotransmitters.
 Soma – In a biological neuron, the soma acts as the summation function, seen in the above mathematical description. As positive and negative signals (exciting and inhibiting, respectively) arrive in the soma from the dendrites, the positive and negative ions are effectively added in summation, by simple virtue of being mixed together in the solution inside the cell's body.
 Axon – The axon gets its signal from the summation behavior which occurs inside the soma. The opening to the axon essentially samples the electrical potential of the solution inside the soma. Once the soma reaches a certain potential, the axon will transmit an all-in signal pulse down its length. In this regard, the axon behaves as the ability for us to connect our artificial neuron to other artificial neurons.

Unlike most artificial neurons, however, biological neurons fire in discrete pulses. Each time the electrical potential inside the soma reaches a certain threshold, a pulse is transmitted down the axon. This pulsing can be translated into continuous values. The rate (activations per second, etc.) at which an axon fires converts directly into the rate at which neighboring cells get signal ions introduced into them. The faster a biological neuron fires, the faster nearby neurons accumulate electrical potential (or lose electrical potential, depending on the "weighting" of the dendrite that connects to the neuron that fired). It is this conversion that allows computer scientists and mathematicians to simulate biological neural networks using artificial neurons which can output distinct values (often from −1 to 1).

Encoding
Research has shown that unary coding is used in the neural circuits responsible for birdsong production. The use of unary in biological networks is presumably due to the inherent simplicity of the coding. Another contributing factor could be that unary coding provides a certain degree of error correction.

Physical artificial cells
There is research and development into physical artificial neurons – organic and inorganic.

For example, some artificial neurons can receive and release dopamine (chemical signals rather than electrical signals) and communicate with natural rat muscle and brain cells, with potential for use in BCIs/prosthetics.

Low-power biocompatible memristors may enable construction of artificial neurons which function at voltages of biological action potentials and could be used to directly process biosensing signals, for neuromorphic computing and/or direct communication with biological neurons.

Organic neuromorphic circuits made out of polymers, coated with an ion-rich gel to enable a material to carry an electric charge like real neurons, have been built into a robot, enabling it to learn sensorimotorically within the real world, rather than via simulations or virtually. Moreover, artificial spiking neurons made of soft matter (polymers) can operate in biologically relevant environments and enable the synergetic communication between the artificial and biological domains.

History
The first artificial neuron was the Threshold Logic Unit (TLU), or Linear Threshold Unit, first proposed by Warren McCulloch and Walter Pitts in 1943. The model was specifically targeted as a computational model of the "nerve net" in the brain. As a transfer function, it employed a threshold, equivalent to using the Heaviside step function. Initially, only a simple model was considered, with binary inputs and outputs, some restrictions on the possible weights, and a more flexible threshold value. Since the beginning it was already noticed that any boolean function could be implemented by networks of such devices, what is easily seen from the fact that one can implement the AND and OR functions, and use them in the disjunctive or the conjunctive normal form.
Researchers also soon realized that cyclic networks, with feedbacks through neurons, could define dynamical systems with memory, but most of the research concentrated (and still does) on strictly feed-forward networks because of the smaller difficulty they present.

One important and pioneering artificial neural network that used the linear threshold function was the perceptron, developed by Frank Rosenblatt. This model already considered more flexible weight values in the neurons, and was used in machines with adaptive capabilities. The representation of the threshold values as a bias term was introduced by Bernard Widrow in 1960 – see ADALINE.

In the late 1980s, when research on neural networks regained strength, neurons with more continuous shapes started to be considered. The possibility of differentiating the activation function allows the direct use of the gradient descent and other optimization algorithms for the adjustment of the weights. Neural networks also started to be used as a general function approximation model. The best known training algorithm called backpropagation has been rediscovered several times but its first development goes back to the work of Paul Werbos.

Types of transfer functions

The transfer function (activation function) of a neuron is chosen to have a number of properties which either enhance or simplify the network containing the neuron.  Crucially, for instance, any multilayer perceptron using a linear transfer function has an equivalent single-layer network; a non-linear function is therefore necessary to gain the advantages of a multi-layer network.

Below, u refers in all cases to the weighted sum of all the inputs to the neuron, i.e. for n inputs,

where w is a vector of synaptic weights and x is a vector of inputs.

Step function
The output y of this transfer function is binary, depending on whether the input meets a specified threshold, θ. The "signal" is sent, i.e. the output is set to one, if the activation meets the threshold.

This function is used in perceptrons and often shows up in many other models. It performs a division of the space of inputs by a hyperplane. It is specially useful in the last layer of a network intended to perform binary classification of the inputs. It can be approximated from other sigmoidal functions by assigning large values to the weights.

Linear combination
In this case, the output unit is simply the weighted sum of its inputs plus a bias term. A number of such linear neurons perform a linear transformation of the input vector. This is usually more useful in the first layers of a network. A number of analysis tools exist based on linear models, such as harmonic analysis, and they can all be used in neural networks with this linear neuron. The bias term allows us to make affine transformations to the data.

See: Linear transformation, Harmonic analysis, Linear filter, Wavelet, Principal component analysis, Independent component analysis, Deconvolution.

Sigmoid

A fairly simple non-linear function, the sigmoid function such as the logistic function also has an easily calculated derivative, which can be important when calculating the weight updates in the network. It thus makes the network more easily manipulable mathematically, and was attractive to early computer scientists who needed to minimize the computational load of their simulations. It was previously commonly seen in multilayer perceptrons. However, recent work has shown sigmoid neurons to be less effective than rectified linear neurons. The reason is that the gradients computed by the backpropagation algorithm tend to diminish towards zero as activations propagate through layers of sigmoidal neurons, making it difficult to optimize neural networks using multiple layers of sigmoidal neurons.

Rectifier

In the context of artificial neural networks, the rectifier or ReLU (Rectified Linear Unit) is an activation function defined as the positive part of its argument:

 

where x is the input to a neuron. This is also known as a ramp function and is analogous to half-wave rectification in electrical engineering. This activation function was first introduced to a dynamical network by Hahnloser et al. in a 2000 paper in Nature with strong biological motivations and mathematical justifications. It has been demonstrated for the first time in 2011 to enable better training of deeper networks, compared to the widely used activation functions prior to 2011, i.e., the logistic sigmoid (which is inspired by probability theory; see logistic regression) and its more practical counterpart, the hyperbolic tangent.

A commonly used variant of the ReLU activation function is the Leaky ReLU which allows a small, positive gradient when the unit is not active:

where x is the input to the neuron and a is a small positive constant (in the original paper the value 0.01 was used for a).

Pseudocode algorithm
The following is a simple pseudocode implementation of a single TLU which takes boolean inputs (true or false), and returns a single boolean output when activated. An object-oriented model is used. No method of training is defined, since several exist. If a purely functional model were used, the class TLU below would be replaced with a function TLU with input parameters threshold, weights, and inputs that returned a boolean value.

 class TLU defined as:
     data member threshold : number
     data member weights : list of numbers of size X
 
     function member fire(inputs : list of booleans of size X) : boolean defined as:
         variable T : number
         T ← 0
         for each i in 1 to X do
             if inputs(i) is true then
                 T ← T + weights(i)
             end if
         end for each
         if T > threshold then
             return true
         else:
             return false
         end if
     end function
 end class

See also 
 Binding neuron
 Connectionism

References

Further reading

External links 
  neuron mimicks function of human cells
 McCulloch-Pitts Neurons (Overview)

Artificial neural networks
American inventions